Peter Van Buskirk is an American retired ice hockey coach. He was involved with both the men's and women's programs at the College of the Holy Cross since 1979, serving as the head coach for both at various times until his retirement in 2019. In that time, he recorded more than 400 wins between the two teams.

Career
Van Buskirk got his start in college hockey as a player for New Hampshire. After graduating in 1965, Van Buskirk served as a Lieutenant in the United States Army during the early year of the Vietnam War. After mustering out of the military, Van Buskirk continued his education at Boston State College, earning a master's in education. He began teaching afterwards and eventually returned to hockey as an assistant coach at Saint John's High School. he became the head coach at Hudson High School the next year and led the program to five regional titles over the next six years. After the Hawks won the Division I state championship in 1978, Van Buskirk was a prime candidate for college programs. When the position at Holy Cross opened in 1979 he returned to the college ranks.

In his very first season with the Crusaders, Van Buskirk got the team to post a 20-win season for the first time as well as win their first postseason game in a decade. After a two-year hiccup, his team posted a second 20-win season and Van Buskirk was named as the co-College Division coach of the year in 1983. He continued to lead the team for another 5 years, producing mostly positive results, before stepping down in 1988. Three years later, he returned as an assistant and served in that capacity until Paul Pearl took a year off to earn his master's. In his absence, Van Buskirk served as head coach and helped the team earn its first postseason win in 14 years.

He left the program for a second time in 1997 but remained with the school, helping Holy Cross found their women's program and then became its head coach in 2000. Over the next 17 seasons, Van Buskirk helped the team become one of the top teams at the Division III level. The Crusaders won 6 open championships and finished as runners-up 5 other times. In 2017 the program made the transition to Division I and continued their winning ways in the NEWHA, finishing third in the standings. The next season Holy Cross joined Hockey East, one of the premier conferences, and Van Buskirk's team struggled mightily against the stiffer competition. The Crusaders won just one game all season, but suffered a further loss after the year when Van Buskirk announced his retirement, turning the team over to Katie Lachapelle.

Head coaching record

Men's

Women's

References

External links

1946 births
American ice hockey coaches
American men's ice hockey defensemen
Living people
Ice hockey people from Massachusetts
People from Hudson, Massachusetts
United States Army personnel of the Vietnam War
Military personnel from Massachusetts
United States Army officers
New Hampshire Wildcats men's ice hockey players
Holy Cross Crusaders men's ice hockey coaches
Holy Cross Crusaders women's ice hockey coaches